Rodrigo da Costa (born 16 August 1993), better known simply as Rodrigo, is a Brazilian beach soccer player who plays as a forward. He won the 2017 FIFA Beach Soccer World Cup representing Brazil and claimed the Silver Shoe (second highest scorer) award at the competition; he has also appeared at two other World Cups (2015, 2019).

Rodrigo is considered one of the world's top players, as recognised at the 2019 Beach Soccer Stars awards.

Biography
Rodrigo grew up playing casual beach soccer on Copacabana beach. He joined his first competitive club, Botafogo, in 2011, aged 18. Three years later in 2014, aged 21, Rodrgio was called up to the Brazilian national team for the first time and was subsequently picked for the 2015 World Cup squad.

He particularly came to prominence in 2016, aged 23, when he won MVP awards in the Russian Superleague and won the Rising Star commendation at the Beach Soccer Stars awards ceremony. The next year, he inspired Brazil to their 2017 World Cup victory in the Bahamas, winning the Silver Shoe (second highest scorer) award with nine goals. In 2017, Rodrigo also joined top Russian club, Kristall. As of 2020, he has scored 150 goals in 112 games for the club in all competitions.

He cemented his place as one of the world's best players when he was named as one of the world's top three players and part of the team of the year at the 2019 Beach Soccer Stars ceremony. Rodrigo now sits just outside the top 10 of Brazil's all-time top scorers.

Rodrigo worked in a stationery shop before pursuing beach soccer. He credits his parents for teaching discipline and respect. As of 2020, he lives in his homeland with his father; he himself is a father.

Statistics

County

Club

Honours
The following is a selection, not an exhaustive list, of the major honours Rodrigo has achieved:

Country
FIFA Beach Soccer World Cup
Winner (1): 2017
World Beach Games
Winner (1): 2019
Intercontinental Cup
Winner (3): 2014, 2016, 2017
CONMEBOL qualifiers for the FIFA Beach Soccer World Cup
Winner (3): 2015, 2017, 2019
Copa América
Winner (2): 2016, 2018
Mundialito
Winner (1): 2017
South American Beach Games
Winner (1): 2019

Club

Euro Winners Cup
Winner (2): 2020, 2021
Runner-up (2): 2015, 2018
Russian Superleague
Winner (2): 2018, 2019
Runner-up (1): 2017
Russian Cup
Winner (3): 2017, 2018, 2019

Individual

FIFA Beach Soccer World Cup (1):
Silver Shoe: 2017

Beach Soccer Stars (2):
Rising Star: 2016
World dream team: 2019

Intercontinental Cup (2):
Best player: 2017, 2018

CONMEBOL qualifiers for the FIFA Beach Soccer World Cup (1):
Top scorer: 2019

Copa América (1):
Best player: 2018

Mundialito (2):
Best player: 2017
Top scorer: 2017

Euro Winners Cup (1):
Best player: 2016

Russian Superleague (3):
Best player: 2017
Top scorer: 2017, 2019

References

External links
Rodrigo da Costa, profile at Beach Soccer Worldwide

1993 births
Living people
Brazilian beach soccer players
Sportspeople from Rio de Janeiro (city)